Dhaka Mass Transit Company Limited, commonly known as DMTCL, is a government-owned company responsible for operating Dhaka Metro Rail, a mass rapid transit system in Dhaka and adjoining areas. The company was established on 3 June 2013 under the Companies Act 1994, a law that governs companies in Bangladesh. Out of 6 metro lines planned by the DMTCL, the MRT Line-6 was inaugurated on 28 December 2022 by the Prime Minister Sheikh Hasina.

References 

Government-owned companies of Bangladesh
Companies based in Dhaka
2013 establishments in Bangladesh
Dhaka Metro Rail
Railway companies of Bangladesh